Yobareh (also Romanized as Yobāreh; also known as Basheyyet and Yobāreh-ye Sheykh Moḩammad) is a village in Esmailiyeh Rural District, in the Central District of Ahvaz County, Khuzestan Province, Iran. At the 2006 census, its population was 38, in 5 families.

References 

Populated places in Ahvaz County